Japan competed at the 2018 Winter Olympics in Pyeongchang, South Korea, from 9 to 25 February 2018, with 124 competitors in 13 sports. They won 13 medals in total, four gold, five silver and four bronze, ranking 11th in the medal table. Six medals of those were won in the speed skating events.

Ski jumper Noriaki Kasai was chosen to be the flag bearer during the opening ceremony. On 9 February 2018, on the opening day of the Games, he became the first athlete in history to participate in 8 different Winter Olympics. The previous record was from the Russian luger Albert Demchenko, with 7 participations.

Medalists

Competitors 
The following is the list of the number of competitors participating at the Games per sport/discipline.

Alpine skiing

Biathlon 

Based on their Nations Cup ranking in the 2016–17 Biathlon World Cup, Japan has qualified 1 man and 5 women.

Cross-country skiing

Curling 

Japan has qualified their men's and women's team (five athletes per gender), by finishing in the top seven teams in Olympic Qualification points.

Summary

Men's tournament

Round-robin
Japan has a bye in draws 1, 4 and 9.

Draw 2
Wednesday, 14 February, 20:05

Draw 3
Thursday, 15 February, 14:05

Draw 5
Friday, 16 February, 20:05

Draw 6
Saturday, 17 February, 14:05

Draw 7
Sunday, 18 February, 09:05

Draw 8
Sunday, 18 February, 20:05

Draw 10
Tuesday, 20 February, 09:05

Draw 11
Tuesday, 20 February, 20:05

Draw 12
Wednesday, 21 February, 14:05

Women's tournament

Round-robin
Japan has a bye in draws 4, 7 and 11.

Draw 1
Wednesday, 14 February, 14:05

Draw 2
Thursday, 15 February, 09:05

Draw 3
Thursday, 15 February, 20:05

Draw 5
Saturday, 17 February, 09:05

Draw 6
Saturday, 17 February, 20:05

Draw 8
Monday, 19 February, 09:05

Draw 9
Monday, 19 February, 20:05

Draw 10
Tuesday, 20 February, 14:05

Draw 12
Wednesday, 21 February, 20:05

Semifinal
Friday, 23 February, 20:05

Bronze Medal Game
Saturday, 24 February, 20:05

Figure skating 

Team event

Freestyle skiing 

Aerials

Halfpipe

Moguls

Ski cross

Qualification legend: FA – Qualify to medal round; FB – Qualify to consolation round

Slopestyle

Ice hockey 

Summary

Women's tournament

Japan women's national ice hockey team qualified by winning the final qualification tournament in Tomakomai, Japan.

Team roster
Women's team event – 1 team of 23 players

Preliminary round

5–8th place semifinal

Fifth place game

Nordic combined

Short track speed skating

According to the ISU Special Olympic Qualification Rankings, Japan has qualified 5 men and 5 women.

On 13 February 2018, Japanese short-track speedskater Kei Saito, a reserve on the 5,000-meter relay team, has tested positive for a banned diuretic acetazolamide, and has been suspended from Winter Olympics for doping.

Men

Women

Qualification legend: ADV – Advanced due to being impeded by another skater; FA – Qualify to medal round; FB – Qualify to consolation round; OR – Olympic record

Skeleton 

Based on the world rankings, Japan qualified 3 sleds.

Ski jumping 

Men

Women

Snowboarding 

Freestyle
Men

Women

Parallel

Speed skating

Men

Women

Mass start

Team pursuit

See also
Japan at the 2017 Asian Winter Games

References

Nations at the 2018 Winter Olympics
2018
Winter Olympics